The hepatic branches of anterior vagal trunk are branches of the anterior vagal trunk that provide parasympathetic innervation the liver, and gallbladder. Each anterior vagal trunk (which is sometimes doubled or tripled) issues 1-2 hepatic branches which run in the superior part of the omentum minus to join the hepatic (nervous) plexus before proceeding to the porta hepatis.

Clinical significance 
Selective vagotomy of the anterior vagal trunk can be performed distal to the hepatic branch (in conjunction with sectioning the posterior vagal trunk distal to its coeliac branches) to curb gastric secretion, however, this often results in gastric stasis (to avoid this complication, a highly selective vagotomy that sections only branches to the gastric fundus and body may be performed instead).

References

Vagus nerve
Nerves of the torso
Liver anatomy